McMillan Township is the name of some places in the U.S. state of Michigan:

 McMillan Township, Luce County, Michigan
 McMillan Township, Ontonagon County, Michigan

See also
McMillan, Michigan, an unincorporated community

Michigan township disambiguation pages